Midtown Crossing at Turner Park is a seven building, 16-acre mixed-use development in midtown Omaha, encompassing 297 condominiums, 196 apartment units, and fine and casual dining, entertainment and shopping. A majority of Midtown Crossing's restaurant and retailer partners are Omaha-born businesses, including Wohlner's Neighborhood Grocery & Deli and Garbo's Salon and Spa.
Built around an expanded and renovated Turner Park, the neighborhood sits between Farnam and Dodge Streets and 31st and 33rd Streets. It is directly to the east of Mutual of Omaha's headquarters, who planned and financed the development, and is located to the west of downtown Omaha. It was the first major project tied to Destination Midtown, a public/private partnership focused on returning historic midtown Omaha to prominence.

Free community events, held in 7-acre Turner Park, are a hallmark of the development and include festivals, concerts, and health and wellness gatherings.

Events 
Midtown Crossing hosts a slate of free community events in Turner Park, including: 
 Omaha Performing Arts' Jazz on the Green
 Turner Park Night Market
 Chalk Art Festival
 Bocce Ball Leagues
 Wednesday Workouts
 Yoga in the Park

Turner Park is also a popular venue for outdoor fitness events and leagues.

Retailers & Restaurants 
 Anderson O'Brien Fine Art
 Callahan Financial Planning
 Chase Bank
 Chef Around the Block Pop-Up Shop
 Cold Stone Creamery / Rocky Mountain Chocolate Factory
 Collins Law Office, PC, LLO
 Corky Boards
 The Corky Canvas
 Definitive Vision
 Element Omaha Midtown Crossing
 The Empire Room
 Fashion Cleaners
 Garbo's Salon and Spa
 Gel Nails
 Genesis Health Clubs
 Goin' Postal
 Long Dog Fat Cat
 Makovicka Physical Therapy
 Milan Laser Hair Removal
 Modern Love
 Pa Mas Taqueria & Grill
 Pickleman's
 PROOF
 Ray's Wings, Pizza and Drinks
 Sea Thai Restaurant
 Smokin' Oak Wood Fired Pizza
 Sofra Kitchen
 Spielbound Board Game Cafe
 Stories Coffee Company
 Thirst Tea Cafe
 uBreakiFix
 Verizon
 Waxing the City
 Wohlner's Neighborhood Grocery & Deli
 Yummy 365

Turner Park 
The origins of Turner Park date back to 1900. Charles Turner, a Nebraska pioneer and prominent real estate professional, donated the original land to the city to be used as a public park. (It was a gift of six acres. The park grew to 7.5 acres with the development of Midtown Crossing.) Turner wanted the park to be known as Curtiss Turner Park in memory of his son, 35-year-old Curtiss C. Turner. A prominent civil engineer, Curtiss Turner was killed in a snow slide in 1898 while working in Alaska's Klondike country at Chilkoot Pass.

Beginning in 1922 the American War Mothers labored to raise money for a World War I monument in Omaha.  By 1925 an impressive $250,000 structure of Bedford limestone designed by famed war memorial sculptor Lorado Taft was proposed for a prominent point in Elmwood Park. However, after years of waning interest, a scaled-back monument was eventually sited and dedicated on November 1, 1937, at the southeast corner of Turner Park.

Pavilion at Turner Park 
Built in 2013, the Pavilion at Turner Park provides a permanent stage (44 ft by 24 ft) and infrastructure, eliminating the need to install and tear down temporary staging facilities for each new event in Turner Park.

Other features include:
 A signature “Saddlespan” fabric roof structure/canopy that can be illuminated with high-efficiency LED lighting effects
 Temporary expanded stage (54 ft × 48 ft) capability
 Concrete area for dancing
 Back of the house staging area for events
Holland Basham Architects, executive architect of the Midtown Crossing development, designed the pavilion, which is funded by private donations through the Omaha Community Foundation.

“We wanted to create an iconic structure that was memorable and enhanced the current environment. You don’t see anything like this around,” said Tim Holland, principal, Holland Basham Architects.

See also 
 History of Omaha
 Midtown Omaha

References 

Midtown Omaha, Nebraska
Buildings and structures in Omaha, Nebraska